"Seriously McDonalds" is the name under which a viral photograph was spread in June 2011. The photograph shows a sign, which is in fact a hoax, claiming that McDonald's has implemented a new policy charging African-Americans more, as "an insurance measure". Despite having existed for some time, the picture was spread around the Internet, especially on Twitter, in June 2011, by people who were offended or amused by the photograph. McDonald's acted quickly to deny the legitimacy of the sign, but it continued to trend on Twitter under the hashtag "#SeriouslyMcDonalds" and "#seriouslymcdonalds" for a few days. The company's response to the hoax has received praise from journalists and public relations professionals.

Photograph
The photograph shows a sign stuck on what is apparently the window of a McDonald's restaurant with tape. The sign reads:

The sign has a footer which says "McDonald's Corporation" and features the McDonald's logo and a helpline number. However, the helpline number actually connects to the KFC Customer Satisfaction Hotline. The picture is a hoax; McDonald's has no such policy.

History

Prior to viral status
The picture had existed for three years on 4chan, and McDonald's had been aware of the image for around a year. The McDonald's social media team were not concerned about the photograph, assigning it a low "impact level", as it made claims that the team thought were too outrageous to be believed.

Lauri Apple, writing for gossip website Gawker, reported, attributing the claim to "various sources on the Twitter", that the image was a meme that first surfaced on 4chan some time before it went viral. Apple also linked to a post showing the picture on McServed.com, a blog which mocks both McDonald's and its customers, dated 17 June 2010.

Viral
It surfaced in June 2011, having been picked up by influential Twitter users, and went viral. The photograph was spread around the Internet by email and on social networking sites, especially Twitter, under the title "Seriously McDonalds". The title is meant as an expression of incredulity at the restaurant chain. Kate Linendoll, technology expert for The Early Show, hypothesised that the picture spread from the blog to Twitter, and that Twitter's "immediacy" allowed the image to go viral "so fast it got out of control".

Response from McDonald's
McDonald's responded to the hoax on 11 June by tweeting "That pic is a senseless & ignorant hoax. McD's values ALL our customers. Diversity runs deep in our culture on both sides of the counter." Despite McDonald's denial, the speed at which the picture spread was increased. McDonald's reiterated their earlier message, tweeting "That Seriously McDonalds picture is a hoax". The photograph became the most highly trending topic over the weekend of the 11–12 June, being spread under the hashtags "#SeriouslyMcDonalds" and "#seriouslymcdonalds". The tag was reportedly used some 20 times per-second over the course of the weekend. The picture was eventually removed from Twitpic, and the speed at which it was spreading declined.

Little damage was done by the hoax, which, in addition to McDonald's response, was revealed through Twitter users' own investigations. The image is no longer well known or remembered, due, according to public relations professional Ann Marie van den Hurk, to McDonald's effective response to the image.

Analysis
Linendoll praised the response from McDonald's, saying that

If you're a big corporation and something viral ... happens against you, you have to formulate a plan and respond quickly ... In this case, McDonald's handled it correctly; they used the medium Twitter they were accused on. Time is of the essence. We're not going to the press in the morning. We're going to the press in real time, when it comes to social networking. You have to respond and respond quickly. Well-handled.

Christopher Barger of Forbes described McDonald's response as "a textbook statement on how to respond to a rumor in 140 characters", although he felt they could have personalised responses and used other social networks. Van den Hurk also presented the response from McDonald's as an example of how organisations can best deal with social media crises.

See also
McDonald's urban legends

References

External links
Cookin' Up Discrimination? on McServed.com

2010s controversies in the United States
2011 hoaxes
African-American-related controversies
Color photographs
Internet hoaxes
Internet memes
June 2011 events in the United States
McDonald's
Twitter controversies
Computer-related introductions in 2009
2011 works
2011 in art
2010s photographs
Racial hoaxes